Wittenberge is a town of eighteen thousand people on the middle Elbe in the district of Prignitz, Brandenburg, Germany.

Geography

Wittenberge is situated at the right (north-eastern) bank of the middle Elbe at its confluence with the Stepenitz and Karthane in the German district of Prignitz. Within the same district, the town borders the Ämter Lenzen-Elbtalaue and Bad Wilsnack/Weisen as well as the district capital Perleberg. The Verbandsgemeinde Seehausen (Altmark) in the district of Stendal, Saxony-Anhalt, lies on the opposite side of the Elbe.

History
The site was marked out in 1239 at Wendischwalde and in 1300 the Saxon king, Otto I, established the settlement. The exact date when Wittenberge attained municipal status is unknown. The oldest document in which Wittenberge is mentioned as a "town" dates from  22 July 1300.  Wittenberge grew slowly but steadily. The town castle (1669) survives as the town museum but it suffered fires in 1686 and 1757, and floods from the Elbe in 1709 and 1761. Nevertheless, because of its position, it prospered from the opening of the Berlin–Hamburg steamship traffic. By 1823 milling, processing and refining of foodstuffs were important industries. In 1846 the railway came and a silk factory was built, followed by a chemical factory in 1849. The Reichsbahn railway workshops were established in 1875 and the world-famous Singer Sewing Machine Company opened in 1903 its German manufacturing site Singer Nähmaschinenfabrik Wittenberge. By 1914 the Rathaus was built.

From 15 August 1942 until 17 February 1945 a concentration camp was established near Wittenberge. The camp was a subcamp to the Neuengamme concentration camp. During WW II Wittenberge suffered severe destruction by five air raids and 216 civilians died.

Between the wars much architecture characteristic of the period was built in the form of workers' housing for the rapidly increased population. Only the railway workshops remain as significant employers of the old industries but the large, skilled workforce remains for the newer industries of precision engineering and applied chemistry.

Sights
The oldest building in Wittenberge is Steintor (stone Gate) dating from 1450, an ancient gate of the medieval city wall. Only a small part of Wittenberge's old town centre with half-timbered houses is left as many old houses were torn down before 1989. The railway station was built in a classicist style in 1846 and rebuilt after considerable bomb damage in World War II. The Town Hall (Rathaus) with its tower measuring 51 metres was inaugurated in 1914. It represents the style of Gründerzeit.

The Kultur- und Festspielhaus, a cultural centre, was built in 1959 in a typical style of Socialist realism. After the German reunification it was renovated in reinaugurated in 1999. It is situated at Paul-Lincke-Platz, a place which is named after the composer Paul Lincke who lived in Wittenberge from 1881 to 1884. In Bahnstraße, Wittenberge's main street, several residential buildings representing Stalinist architecture on a provincial level can be seen close to the Cultural Centre. They were renovated after the German reunification.

A factory for producing sewing-machines was founded in Wittenberge in 1903. Its clock tower measuring 49 metres which was built in 1928 is one of the symbols of Wittenberge.

Demography

Mayor
 1993–2008: Klaus Petry (SPD)
 since 2008: Oliver Hermann (independent)

Oliver Hermann was reelected in 2016 with 94,8% of the vote.

International relations

Twin towns – Sister cities
Wittenberge is twinned with:

  Châlons-en-Champagne, France
  Elmshorn, Germany 
  Razgrad, Bulgaria

Notable people
 Friedrich Burmeister (1888–1968), politician of the GDR (Minister of mail and telecommunications)
 Klaus Havenstein (1922–1998), German actor and cabaret artist
 Emanuel Hirsch (1888–1972), Protestant theologian
 Norbert Klaar (born 1954), sports shooter, Olympic champion 1976 (fast fire pistol)
 Richard Kruspe (born 1967), musician, guitarist of the band Rammstein
 Carl Lindenberg (1850–1928), jurist and philatelist
 Ulrich Makosch (1933–2008), journalist (television of the GDR)
 Uwe Potteck (born 1955), sportsman, Olympic champion 1976 (free pistol)
 Friedrich Schorlemmer (born 1944), theologian
 Herman C. Schultz (born 1860), politician
 Otto Telschow (1876–1945), politician of the NSDAP, Gauleiter, member of the Reichstag
 Stefanie Thurmann (born 1982), sports shooter
 Ulrich Woronowicz (1928–2011), Protestant pastor, theologian and social activist

References

External links

Localities in Prignitz
Neuengamme concentration camp
Populated riverside places in Germany
Populated places on the Elbe